Ana Celia Zentella is a Puerto Rican/Mexican linguist known for her "anthro-political" approach to linguistic research and expertise on multilingualism, linguistic diversity, and language intolerance, especially in relation to U.S. Latinx languages and communities. She is Professor Emerita of Ethnic Studies at the University of California, San Diego.

Her 1997 book Growing up bilingual: Puerto Rican children in New York was honored by the British Association for Applied Linguistics and the Association of Latina and Latino Anthropologists of the American Anthropology Association. Zentella was honored as a 2005 Frank Bonilla Public Intellectual of the Year by the Latino Studies section of the Latin American Studies Association. She was also recognized by the Society for Linguistic Anthropology for her Public Outreach & Community Service.

In 1996, Manhattan Borough President Ruth Messinger declared October 30th as "Doctor Ana Celia Zentella Day" in honor of "her leading role in building appreciation for language diversity and respect for language rights".

Biography 
Zentella was born in the South Bronx, New York City to a Puerto Rican mother and a Mexican father. Growing up in the 1950s, she was exposed not only to multiple languages but also to multiple varieties of Spanish in the community.  

She attended Hunter College, CUNY   in the Bronx  as an undergraduate, obtaining a B.A. degree in Spanish. She went on to complete a M.A. in Romance Languages and Literatures at Pennsylvania State University, and obtained a PhD in Educational Linguistics in 1981 at the University of Pennsylvania, with a dissertation was titled "Hablamos los dos. We speak both": Growing up bilingual in el barrio. 

Zentella was Professor of Black and Puerto Rican Studies (now the Department of Africana/Puerto Rican/Latino Studies) at Hunter College, CUNY from 1990 to 2001. She was Chair for the Language and Social Justice Committee of the American Anthropology Association from the 2010 to 2012. At the time of her retirement, she was Professor of Ethnic Studies at University of California, San Diego.

Research 
Zentella's research adopts a political perspective on linguistic anthropology that "places language in its social context and acknowledges that there is no language without power. In other words, issues of power are deeply embedded in all aspects of language."  Much of her research focuses on U.S. varieties of Spanish, English, and Spanglish, practices of language socialization in Latinx families, and the societal impact of “English-only" laws.  She notes that when English and Spanish speakers interact, it can be difficult to decide which language to speak. Sometimes when non-Spanish speakers use the few Spanish words in their vocabularies to communicate, they come across as genuine and considerate, while at other times their use of phrases such as “no problemo” and “comprendee” comes off as offensive or mocking of Spanish speakers.

She has explored how specific linguistic features may shift in their distribution when different groups of speakers converge. As an example, she and her colleagues have explored the overt use of pronouns as a marker of the linguistic identities of different groups of Spanish-speakers residing in New York City. In another study, she recorded the language practices of high school and college students who live in Tijuana, Mexico, but travel to San Diego, California on a daily basis to attend school.  Through interviews with these students, known as transfronterizos, she documented the conflicts they experience around language use and identity, and stigma associated with their use of Spanglish.

Books 

 Otheguy, R., & Zentella, A. C. (2012). Spanish in New York: Language contact, dialectal leveling, and structural continuity. Oxford University Press.
 Zentella, A. C. (1997). Growing up bilingual: Puerto Rican children in New York. Blackwell Publishers.
 Zentella, A. C. (Ed.). (2005). Building on strength: Language and literacy in Latino families and communities. Teachers College Press.
 Zentella, A. C. (Ed.) (2009). Multilingual San Diego: Portraits of language loss and revitalization. University Readers.

Awards and honors

National Honors Societies and Student Fellowships 

 Phi Beta Kappa (1960)
 Sigma Delta Pi (Spanish, 1960)
 Kappa Delta Pi  (Education, 1960)
 NYS Regents Fellowship, Class of 1878 Fellowship (1960)
 Pennsylvania State University Teaching Assistantship (Romance Langs)
 University of Kansas Graduate Fellowship (Linguistics)
 Linguistic Society of America Summer Institute Fellowship
 University of Pennsylvania Graduate Fellowship

Research Fellowships 

 School of American Research NEH Fellow, Santa Fe, NM, 1998-99
 Stanford University Humanities Center Fellow, 1991-1992
 Rockefeller Foundation Bellagio Residency, Italy, summer 1991

References

External links 
 UCSD Faculty Homepage

Bilingualism
Multilingualism
Ethnic studies
Hispanic and Latino American people
Hunter College alumni
Pennsylvania State University alumni
University of Pennsylvania School of Arts and Sciences alumni
Hunter College faculty
University of California, San Diego faculty
Living people
Year of birth missing (living people)